Bonagota moronaecola is a moth of the family Tortricidae which is endemic to Ecuador. The specific epithet refers to Morona-Santiago Province, where the type locality is situated; the suffix –colo is Latin for "I live".

References

Euliini
Moths described in 2006
Endemic fauna of Ecuador
Fauna of Ecuador
Moths of South America
Taxa named by Józef Razowski